SocietyOne is an Australian peer-to-peer lending company, often referred to as the first peer-to-peer lender to have entered the Australian market.

History
Based on UK peer-to-peer lending businesses such as Zopa and Ratesetter, SocietyOne was founded in August 2011 by Andy Taylor, Matt Symons, and Greg Symons (not related). In March 2016, Former senior Westpac banker Jason Yetton was hired as CEO. Jason set a public goal in 2016 to control 2-3% of Australia's $100 billion personal credit market by 2020-21. He stepped down in July 2018 making Mark Jones CEO.

Finance 
In the third quarter of 2017, it was reported that a total of over $350 million had been borrowed on Society One’s platform since 2012. As of June 30, 2018, that number reached $465 million and the total valuation of the lending book reached $218 million.  Despite its growth, Society One is expected to need a $500 million lending book to start breaking even.

References

External links 
 

Companies based in Sydney
Peer-to-peer lending companies
Australian companies established in 2012